Massilia aurea is a Gram-negative, rod-shaped non-spore-forming motile and strictly aerobic bacterium from the genus Massilia and family Oxalobacteraceae. It was isolated from the drinking water distribution system in Seville, Spain. M. aurea produces yellow-pigmented colonies.

Etymology
The specific name aurea comes from the Latin adjective aurea ("golden") which refers to the yellow pigment that M. aurea produces.

References

External links
Type strain of Massilia aurea at BacDive -  the Bacterial Diversity Metadatabase

Burkholderiales
Bacteria described in 2006